The Battle of Wazzin was a conflict during the Libyan Civil War for the Libyan-Tunisian border town of Wazzin. Rebel forces made an initial victory, but it was short-lived as Gaddafi's men re-occupied the town, only to lose it again to the rebels.

The battle spilled over into Tunisian territory on several occasions, prompting clashes with the Tunisian military (which had not explicitly taken a side in the battle).

The fighting turned Wazzin into something of a ghost town, valuable only as a strategic location.

Background
In the early days of the war, towns in the Nafusa Mountains quickly joined the uprising against Muammar Gaddafi, but soon came under heavy attack by loyalist forces. Wazzin was initially taken by rebels, but soon fell under the control of loyalists, cutting off this supply line to the rebel-held mountain towns. To relieve the military and humanitarian pressure on their besieged towns, the rebels fought to retake the crossing.

Battle
On 21 April, rebel forces assaulted Wazzin but were met with fierce resistance by loyalist soldiers. Their advances were initially slow but eventually they overwhelmed Gaddafi's men, taking the town of Wazzin before swiftly capturing the crossing itself, causing Gaddafi's men to be trapped in between the Tunisian border and the advancing rebels. In the end, 105 loyalist soldiers retreated into Tunisia where they surrendered to Tunisian officials.

All of Gaddafi's men returned to Libya without charge, however 13 men captured by the rebels remained in their hands.

With the border post in rebel hands, they began bringing supplies from Tunisia into the besieged towns of the Nafusa Mountains.

On 24 April, loyalist forces began shelling the border post in an attempt to recapture it, though no casualties were reported.

On 28 April, loyalist forces re-captured the Wazzin border crossing with Tunisia after a swift advance in which they pushed the rebels back over the border into Tunisia where the fighting continued on the edge of the Tunisian border town of Dehiba. State TV stated that several rebels were killed and others captured in the attack on the border post. Later during the day, the rebels attempted a counter-attack. Initially, they claimed having re-taken the post. However, Reuters denied it later by confirming that the loyalists were still in full control. During the confusion, when it was thought that the rebels had won, scores of civilian vehicles attempted to re-enter Libya from Tunisia. But, they quickly turned back when they found Gaddafi's forces were still at the border crossing. Heavy fighting continued into the night, with rebels apparently massing for a renewed attack against the better-armed loyalists and during the evening the rebels once again claimed to had re-taken the crossing after they received reinforcements from Zintan. Still, this claim was also later found to be untrue.

The next morning, loyalist troops advanced from the crossing post of Wazzin in pursuit of the rebels, who had retreated onto Tunisian soil after a night of fighting, over the border and engaged them in the center of the town of Dehiba. Soon after that clashes between Gaddafi and Tunisian troops were reported. The Tunisian military soon seized loyalist troops and led them back over the border. At the same time, the rebels again claimed to have re-taken the border post. However, Al Jazeera confirmed that the Gaddafi green flag of Libya was still flying over the border post thus proving that government troops were still in control. Control of the post shifted back and forth in the following days.

Libyan Army enters Tunisia
By 29 April, the situation on the border with Tunisia began deteriorating rapidly. Rebel forces were frequently using the border region as a way to evade capture by Gaddafi forces, as well as a principal resupply route. In response, the loyalist forces launched an artillery barrage on the Tunisian town of Dehiba, and advanced across the border. Elements of the Tunisian Army and border police, who had only recently returned to their posts following the border violation on 28 April responded with deadly force to the incursion. By mid-afternoon, press reports came in stating that the Tunisian military was engaged in combat with the Libyan Army in central Dehiba. Later in the day fights between pro-Gaddafi forces and Tunisian army had ceased. The Tunisian military had captured and disarmed pro-Gaddafi soldiers and then sent them back to Libya.

As of 1 May, Gaddafi's forces were still shelling Tunisian territory, although no further casualties were reported.

On 7 May, renewed fighting in Wazzin lead to more shells falling in Tunisian territory, sparking mass evacuations in the border town of Dehiba. Roughly 100 shells fell in Tunisian territory causing one house to be damaged yet nobody was killed. The Tunisian authorities stated that the situation was 'very dangerous' and that they would do everything they had to in order to protect their country.

Nine days later, on 16 May, Tunisian troops stopped 200 loyalist soldiers in 4×4s crossing into Tunisia to try to outflank the rebels. The soldiers cooperated and there was no confrontation.

On 9 July, there were sketchy reports that Gaddafi's men were still attacking Wazzin and of a large loyalist army amassing nearby, possibly with the intention of retaking the crossing.

On 29 July, rebels attacked loyalists in nearby Ayn Ghazaya. Heavy fighting ensued, and rebels shut down the crossing until it was more secure.

References

Wazzin
Wazzin
Wazzin
2011 in Tunisia
Battles in 2011